Mariska & Pahat Sudet is the debut album of the Finnish band Mariska & Pahat Sudet. It was released on 10 May 2010. In its first week of release, the album peaked at number 16 on the Official Finnish Album Chart. In spite of the somewhat low peak position, the album managed to stay on the chart for 24 weeks and eventually earned the band a gold record.

Singles
Two singles were released,"Suloinen myrkynkeittäjä" and "Kokkaa mua".

Track listing

Chart performance

References

Mariska (rapper) albums
2010 debut albums
Sony Music albums
Albums produced by Jukka Immonen
Finnish-language albums